The 1980 Atlantic Coast Conference men's basketball tournament was held in Greensboro, North Carolina, at the Greensboro Coliseum from February 28 through March 1. Duke defeated Maryland, 73–72, to win the championship. Maryland's Albert King was named the tournament MVP, becoming the last player to date (as of the 2018 tournament) to have been named MVP without playing on the tournament winners. Georgia Tech played in this event for the first time as the ACC returned to an eight-team configuration for the first time since the departure of South Carolina in 1971.

Bracket

References

Tournament
ACC men's basketball tournament
College sports tournaments in North Carolina
Basketball competitions in Greensboro, North Carolina
ACC men's basketball tournament
ACC men's basketball tournament